Park Royal was a railway station in Park Royal, London. It was opened by the Great Western Railway temporarily between 15 June 1903 and 5 July 1903 to serve an exhibition at the Royal Agricultural Showground at Park Royal services ran from Paddington to Ealing Broadway station via the Greenford loop at which time it was the only station on the line. The station opened again on 1 May 1904 when services on New North Main Line began. It closed on 27 September 1937 following the opening of  along the line to the north-west in 1932.

References

Former Great Western Railway stations
Disused railway stations in the London Borough of Ealing
Park Royal
Railway stations in Great Britain opened in 1903
Railway stations in Great Britain closed in 1903
Railway stations in Great Britain opened in 1904
Railway stations in Great Britain closed in 1915
Railway stations in Great Britain opened in 1920
Railway stations in Great Britain closed in 1937